Berenberg may refer to:

Berenberg Bank, a German financial institution
Berenberg family, a banking family after which Berenberg Bank is named
Berenberg (surname), other people with the surname Berenberg